The Budweiser Frogs are three lifelike puppet frogs named "Bud", "Weis", and "Er", who began appearing in American television commercials for Budweiser beer during Super Bowl XXIX in 1995. Adweek called it one of the "most iconic alcohol campaigns in advertising history". The first Budweiser Frogs commercial was created by David Swaine, Michael Smith and Mark Choate of DMB&B/St. Louis. The commercial was directed by Gore Verbinski, who would later direct the first three Pirates of the Caribbean films.

Bud, Weis, and Er 
The commercial began with a scene of a swamp at nighttime, and a close-up of Bud rhythmically croaking his name.  Later Weis and Er join in. They croak rather randomly for about ten seconds, until Bud, Weis, and Er begin croaking in sequence, thus forming the Budweiser name. Their croaking becomes quicker as the camera pulls back to show a bar with a large neon Budweiser sign glowing in the night. The commercial is often listed among the best Super Bowl commercials in history, ranking at No. 5 at MSNBC's list in 2004. Several more Frog ads were produced, with Hollywood Animatronic Effects company The Character Shop brought online to give the frogs more flexibility and capabilities. In one ad, the three Bud Frogs are sitting on a log in a Louisiana swamp, chanting their "Bud...Weis...Er" chorus, when a Budweiser truck rolls by. The "Bud" frog zaps out his sticky tongue, latching onto the moving truck. Like an elastic bungee, the tongue stretches to the point where it can no more, then launches the frog off the log, sending him flying through the air after the truck, while a "Yee-Haw!" and Cajun music is heard. The frog puppets featured silicone skins over animatronic armatures, which allowed the frogs to breathe, bloat their throats, speak, and blink and move their eyes, via Radio Control and Rod Operation. A subsequent ad featured not the entire trio, but rather Bud and a newfound female frog. One later Super Bowl commercial featuring the frogs had them riding on the back of an alligator into the bar, where they croak their names at the startled patrons, and leave with a crate of Budweiser beer strapped to the alligator's waist while dancing to Jamming by Bob Marley and the Wailers.

Louie, Frankie, and the Ferret 
After the initial ads generated great interest, new creatures began making appearances in the swamp.  Beginning at Super Bowl XXXII, a new campaign created by Goodby, Silverstein & Partners introduced two wisecracking chameleons made their debut.  Louie, notable for his distinct Brooklyn accent (he was voiced by New York City voice actor Paul Christie), was irritated by the frogs' incessant croaking, and jealous of their success, while Frankie, who speaks in a low baritone voice (voiced by the Broadway veteran Danny Mastrogiorgio), was his more rational, even-tempered friend.  Frankie apparently socialized with the frogs and was puzzled by Louie's animosity towards them.

As the series' storyline progressed, it documented Louie's enlisting the assistance of an inept ferret hit man, who tries to kill the frogs by dismantling and dropping the Budweiser neon sign into the swamp water, thus electrocuting them. Although this assassination attempt failed, it resulted in Weis developing post-electroshock muscular irregularity. Louie briefly replaced Weis in the Bud-Weis-Er cheer, but ended up getting all of them fired, due to Louie's inability to just follow the script.  The other frogs in return gave him a literal tongue-lashing and revealed to Louie that they could speak with a complete vocabulary and that they knew all along about his plot against them.  These three frogs then began a new lifestyle as flashy tap-dancing and Fred Astaire-mimicking acts on Broadway.

The Budweiser Lizards later displaced the frogs entirely and continued appearing in television and radio advertisements into the early 2000s. In March 1999 Budweiser released a CD, Frank & Louie's Greatest Hits, featuring songs such as "Sweet Home Alabama", "My Sharona", and "Rock This Town" woven around alternate takes of some of Frank and Louie's radio ads.

Controversy 
Much like the Joe Camel controversy around the time of the frogs' popularity, a 1996 study showed that children often recognized the Budweiser frogs as much as other ad icons like Ronald McDonald and Tony the Tiger, as well as other cartoon characters like Bugs Bunny. Many have speculated that Budweiser's frogs were targeting younger people to their alcoholic products. Anheuser-Busch denied this, but because of such findings, Budweiser eventually slowed down the ad campaign in the years ahead, and by 2000 the frogs were discontinued and replaced by lizards, which appealed to an older audience than the frogs did. However, the frogs and lizards were in some of the same commercials.

In popular culture
The first episode of MADtv from 1995 did a parody of the Budweiser Frogs' "Truck" commercial, where the brand was parodied as "Vudweiser" and its slogan "King of Beers" was parodied as "Prince of Beers"; thus with the frog "Bud" changed to "Vud". Vud sticks his tongue to the back of a passing beer truck in a manner similar to the Budweiser commercial. Vud then flies through the air attached to the truck but the frog's "Yee-Haw" startles the driver, who then brakes suddenly. This causes the frog to fatally collide with the truck's back door.
In 1996, a rap song called Motivators by A Tribe Called Quest samples the frogs.
In the January 12, 1997 The Simpsons episode "The Springfield Files", the three frogs say their names, and are then eaten by an alligator who growls "Coors".
In the September 9, 1997 direct-to-video film Casper: A Spirited Beginning the Ghostly Trio parodied the frogs taking on a green appearance and saying Bull... doze... er before possessing a bulldozer.
 An incorrect computer virus report exists, in which downloading a screensaver of the Frogs destroys your computer. While it is claimed this is a virus hoax it is based on the misunderstanding. If the computer was defragmenting the harddrive at the same time, the screensaver interfered with the writing or verification of the data, resulting in overwritten and destroyed data. The assumption was a virus, which is not correct; it was the result of a poorly written program.
 A 2001 rap song called Terrorwrist (Beneath the Under) by Mix Master Mike samples the frogs.
 A 2011 episode of SportsNation on ESPN2 briefly parodied this commercial, where one of the three was sportscaster Michelle Beadle in a frog suit.
 A bumper for the Sirius XM satellite radio station '90s on 9 parodies this ad.
 An episode of Robot Chicken from the seventh season titled "Link's Sausages" contains a sketch featuring the Bud Frogs, where Bud laments that he has a drinking problem and has contracted cirrhosis of the liver as a result.

See also 

 Budweiser (Anheuser-Busch)

References

External links 
 Article about the Budweiser Frogs
Web page describing the build and shoot of several of the Bud Frogs ads
 Budweiser Frogs at TVAcres.com
 Modern Ferret Magazine chooses the Budweiser Ferret as Ferret Of The Century

Frog mascots
Anheuser-Busch advertising
Corporate mascots
Drink advertising characters